The 2017 Deloitte Tankard, the provincial men's curling championship of Nova Scotia, was held from January 19 to 24 at the Mayflower Curling Club in Halifax. The winning Jamie Murphy team represented Nova Scotia at the 2017 Tim Hortons Brier in St.John's, Newfoundland.

Teams
Teams are as follows:

Round robin standings

Scores
Draw 2
Dexter 8-6 Mayhew
Murphy 9-1 Flemming
S. Thompson 5-1 MacDougall
Stevens 8-2 K. Thompson

Draw 4
S. Thompson 12-6 Flemming
Dexter 10-4 K. Thompson
Mayhew 8-6 Stevens
MacDougall 8-7 Murphy

Draw 6 
MacDougall 10-1 Stevens
Mayhew 5-3 S. Thompson
Murphy 8-1 K. Thompson
Dexter 9-3 Flemming

Draw 8
Murphy 8-2 S. Thompson
Stevens 8-2 Dexter
Flemming 5-4 MacDougall
K. Thompson 8-4 Mayhew

Draw 10
MacDougall 9-7 Dexter
Murphy 7-4 Mayhew
S. Thompson 9-8 K. Thompson
Stevens 8-1 Flemming

Draw 12
Murphy 8-3 Stevens
K. Thompson 8-6 MacDougall
Flemming 7-2 Mayhew
S. Thompson 9-4 Dexter

Draw 14
K. Thompson 9-8 Flemming
S. Thompson 9-4 Stevens
Murphy 4-3 Dexter
MacDougall 8-6 Mayhew

Playoffs

Semifinal
Saturday, January 28, 2:00 pm

Final
Sunday, January 29, 10:00am

References

January 2017 sports events in Canada
2017 Tim Hortons Brier
Curling in Nova Scotia
Sport in Halifax, Nova Scotia
2017 in Nova Scotia